Robin Udegbe (born 20 March 1991) is a German professional footballer who plays as a goalkeeper for KFC Uerdingen 05.

Career
On 20 July 2020, Udegbe was released by KFC Uerdingen 05.

Personal life
He is of Nigerian descent and he expressed his wish to represent Nigeria.

References

External links
 

1991 births
Living people
Sportspeople from Kiel
German sportspeople of Nigerian descent
German footballers
Footballers from Schleswig-Holstein
Association football goalkeepers
Eredivisie players
Regionalliga players
Oberliga (football) players
VVV-Venlo players
KFC Uerdingen 05 players
SV 19 Straelen players
German expatriate footballers
German expatriate sportspeople in the Netherlands
Expatriate footballers in the Netherlands